Sece Parish is an administrative unit of Aizkraukle Municipality, Latvia.  From 2009 until 2021 it was part of the former Jaunjelgava Municipality. Prior to the 2009 administrative reforms it was part of the Aizkraukle District. Latvian law defines Sece Parish as a part of the Selonia region.

Towns, villages and settlements of Sece Parish 
Biķernieki 
Dalbes 
Kaļandri 
Kampāni
Pinkas 
Purviņi 
Sece 
Škutāni 
Šļūkas 
Ziedāni

References

Parishes of Latvia
Aizkraukle Municipality
Selonia